Ninnescah Township may refer to the following townships in the United States:

 Ninnescah Township, Cowley County, Kansas
 Ninnescah Township, Kingman County, Kansas
 Ninnescah Township, Sedgwick County, Kansas